Pasir Ris MRT station is an elevated Mass Rapid Transit (MRT) station on the East West line (EWL) in Pasir Ris, Singapore. Situated along Pasir Ris Central adjacent to Pasir Ris Bus Interchange and the White Sands Shopping Mall, it is the eastern terminus of the EWL and, as of June 2021, the only MRT station within Pasir Ris. The station exterior has the characteristic dome-shaped segmented roof also seen on other elevated EWL stations.

The station opened on 16 December 1989 as the terminus of the MRT's eastern line extension. In 2016, two maintenance workers were killed on the tracks away from the station. In January 2019, it was announced that the station would become an interchange, with the opening of the Cross Island line (CRL) by 2030. The station is also planned to be the terminus for the future CRL branch extension to Punggol station in 2032, as announced in March 2020.

History

The station was constructed as the terminus of an extension of the East West MRT line from Tanah Merah station, which in turn was part of Phase 2A of the MRT system. The contract also included the construction of the Tampines and Simei stations.

The station opened on 16 December 1989 as the eastern terminus of the EWL as announced by then-deputy prime minister Goh Chok Tong on 4 November that year. The opening ceremony, officiated by then-Minister of State Mah Bow Tan, included an MRT ride for Mah and four other Members of Parliament from Simei to this station. The station opening was generally well received by residents in Tampines and Pasir Ris, who were hoping for quicker rides to their workplaces in the city via the MRT.

EWL station upgrades

Like the other elevated MRT stations, Pasir Ris station did not initially have platform screen doors installed. On 25 January 2008, the Land Transport Authority (LTA) announced the installation half-height platform screen doors on elevated stations to improve safety on elevated stations. The installation began at Pasir Ris station in August 2009 and the doors began operations later in November. High-volume low-speed fans were installed above the platforms of the station between 2012 and 2013 as part of a national programme to improve ventaliation at station platforms.

A new crossover, in conjunction with the implementation of communications-based train control (CBTC), will allow faster turnarounds for trains and segregation of platforms at the terminus. The station's operations will be unaffected by the works as the enhancement works will be done away from the station itself. In March 2019, the contract for the construction of new overrun and crossover tracks was awarded to China Civil Engineering Construction Corporation Branch Office Singapore / Gates PCM Construction Ltd (JV). The S$56.7 million (US$ million) contract included the partial removal of existing overrun tracks. Construction commenced in 2019 and will be completed by mid 2024.

Cross Island Line
On 17 January 2013, transport minister Lui Tuck Yew announced that the proposed Cross Island line (CRL) will serve the Pasir Ris area. On 25 January 2019, the LTA confirmed that Pasir Ris station will be an interchange with the CRL. The CRL station will be constructed as part of Phase 1, consisting of 12 stations between Aviation Park and Bright Hill, and was expected to be completed in 2029. On 10 March 2020, it was announced that this station will serve as the eastern terminus for the CRL extension to Punggol station. The  Punggol extension, consisting of four stations between this station and Punggol, was expected to be completed in 2031. However, the restrictions imposed on construction works due to the COVID-19 pandemic has led to delays and the dates was pushed by one year to 2030 and 2032 for CRL1 and CRLe respectively.

The contract for the design and construction of Pasir Ris CRL Station and associated tunnels was awarded to a joint venture between Daewoo Engineering & Construction Co Ltd and Dongah Geological Engineering Co Ltd Singapore Branch at S$980 million (US$ million) on 26 April 2021. Construction was scheduled to begin in the fourth quarter of 2021, with expected completion in 2030.

Incident

On 22 March 2016, two SMRT maintenance trainees were run over and killed by an incoming C151 train at around 11:10am. They were part of a team of 15 personnel tasked to investigate a possible signalling system fault, after a high voltage alarm set off. This led to a 2.5-hour train service disruption from 11:10 am to 1:56 pm for train services between Pasir Ris and Tanah Merah, and had affected at least 10,000 commuters.

In light of the incident, train operator SMRT Trains laid off the train driver and the assistant engineer Lim Say Heng and has disciplined the staff for their role in the incident. The operator, the director of control operations and the engineer were charged for the incident. Upon investigation, it was revealed that safety protocols were not implemented that would have prevented the train from entering the worksite. The SMRT engineer Lim, who had been responsible for "[ensuring] a safe inspection", was sentenced to four weeks' jail on 4 March 2018 after pleading guilty to causing death by negligence. On 20 July 2018, the Land Transport Authority fined the operator S$1.9 million (US$ million) for the incident, in addition to the Bishan tunnel flooding.

Station details

Location
As the name suggests, the station serves the town of Pasir Ris. The station is adjacent to the White Sands Shopping Mall and the Pasir Ris Bus Interchange, and is close to prominent landmarks such as the Pasir Ris Town Park, Pasir Ris Sports and Recreation Centre, Pasir Ris Park and the retail development of Downtown East.

The station will serve a mixed-use commercial and residential development that will integrate with the bus interchange, a polyclinic and a town plaza. The site for the development has been awarded to Phoenix Residential Pte. Ltd. & Phoenix Commercial Pte. Ltd. at a contract sum of S$700 million (US$ million) in March 2019.

Services
As of June 2021, Pasir Ris is the eastern terminus of the EWL. The next station on the line is Tampines station. The official station code is EW1. The station operates between 5:28am and 11:23pm. Train frequencies range from 2 to 5 minutes depending on peak hours.

When the CRL Phase 1 and the Punggol extension is completed, the station will be between the Pasir Ris East and Tampines North stations on the mainline. The CRL will branch off from this station to Punggol station via Elias station, which is the next station on the branch.

Design

Like most EWL elevated stations on the eastern segment on the line (after Kallang station), Pasir Ris station has a prominent dome-shaped roof, segmented like a caterpillar, over the platform level. The design was intended by the MRT Corporation to give the stations on the EWL an "attractive look". The station has a pink colour scheme, reflected on the doors to the restricted areas and the ceiling trunking box at the platform level of the station.

References

External links

 
 Pasir Ris to Changi Airport MRT station route

Railway stations in Singapore opened in 1989
Pasir Ris
Mass Rapid Transit (Singapore) stations